is a railway station in Kawatana, Nagasaki Prefecture, Japan. It is operated by JR Kyushu and is on the Ōmura Line.

Lines
Besides the local services on the line, some trains of the Rapid Seaside Liner also stop at the station.

Station layout 
The station consists of a side platform serving a single tracks. The station building is a steel frame structure of modern design and houses a waiting room and ticket window. A bike shed is located outside at the station forecourt. A footbridge allows pedestrians to cross from one side of the tracks to the other.

The station is unstaffed by JR Kyushu but a kan'i itaku agent operates the ticket window and sells some types of tickets.

Adjacent stations

History
Japanese Government Railways (JGR) opened the station on 21 October 1944 as an additional station on the existing track of the Ōmura Line. With the privatization of Japanese National Railways (JNR), the successor of JGR, on 1 April 1987, control of the station passed to JR Kyushu.

Passenger statistics
In fiscal 2014, there were a total of 40,082 boarding passengers, giving a daily average of 110 passengers.

Environs
Ogushi Post Office
National Route 205

See also
 List of railway stations in Japan

References

External links
Ogushigō Station (JR Kyushu)

Railway stations in Nagasaki Prefecture
Railway stations in Japan opened in 1944